Thomas Möller  (born 7 June 1964) is a former president of the Hells Angels in Sweden.

Möller was one of the founders of the car-and-bike club Dirty Dräggels in Malmö. This club became a hangaround chapter of Hells Angels Denmark in 1990, prospects in 1991 and Sweden's first regular Hells Angels club in 1993. Möller became the club's vice president and Hells Angels' spokesman in Sweden, and later president. In 2003, the president title was handed over to his successor.

Möller's extravagant lifestyle in South Africa, where he lived in a seaside property in Llandudno close to Cape Town became the source of scrutiny from Swedish and South African authorities. In December 2007, the Swedish tax authorities demanded a payment of SEK 4.1 million from Möller due to undeclared income, which according to him was untaxable gambling profits. In March 2009, Möller's sickness benefit pay, which he had claimed for 10 years due to an alleged back injury, was withdrawn by the Swedish Social Insurance Agency, with demands for repayment to possibly follow.

See also 
Great Nordic Biker War

References 

Living people
Gang members
Hells Angels
People from Malmö
Swedish criminals
Swedish expatriates in South Africa
Swedish gangsters
1964 births